Voulez-Vous (French for "Do you want (to)?") is the sixth studio album by the Swedish supergroup ABBA. Released on 23 April 1979, the album yielded five hits, all of them big 1979 singles in Britain – "Chiquitita", "Does Your Mother Know", "I Have a Dream" and the double A-side "Voulez-Vous"/"Angeleyes". The title track showed the group embracing disco music, which at the time was at its peak. The album topped the charts in a number of countries and ranked among Britain's five best-selling albums of the year.

It was the first ABBA album to be mainly recorded at Polar Studios in Stockholm, and the only ABBA album to include a studio recording made outside Sweden: the instrumental backing track for the title track was partly recorded at Criteria Studios in Miami.

Voulez-Vous was first released on CD in 1984. The album has been digitally remastered and reissued four times; first in 1997, then in 2001 and in 2005 as part of The Complete Studio Recordings box set, and yet again in 2010 for the Voulez-Vous Deluxe Edition.

Background and production
In early 1978, ABBA were at the peak of their success and having just completed promotion for their latest album and theatrical film release, thoughts were turned to the next album, which was planned to be released in time for Christmas. Sessions however proved to be difficult and after starting on 13 March 1978 with the ultimately unreleased track "Dr Claus von Hamlet", a number of compositions were demoed and rejected. Indeed, after six months, only two songs that would end up on the finished album ("The King Has Lost His Crown" and "Lovers (Live a Little Longer)") were completed.

During this time the group opened their own recording studio, Polar Studios in Stockholm, which was among the most advanced in the world at the time and would be where ABBA would work from here on. Two songs recorded at this time were "Lovelight" and "Dream World". However, neither song would appear on the Voulez-Vous album ("Lovelight" would be used as the B-side to the single "Chiquitita", while "Dream World" would remain unreleased until 1994; both songs are now featured as bonus tracks on re-issues of the Voulez-Vous album). Other tracks started but subsequently scrapped included "Just a Notion", which was later included on Voyage (2021).

By September 1978, ABBA had been absent from the charts for some months, and so a song from the recording sessions, "Summer Night City", was released as a single. Never happy with the finished song, members Benny Andersson and Björn Ulvaeus regretted the release and lamented the fact that it peaked lower than previous singles in the charts, not being released at all in the US. They considered the UK to be their most important market, and there it had ended a run of No. 1 hits by stalling at No. 5 - their smallest hit for three years. A full-length version was however still planned for the upcoming album, but ultimately never used. By this time, tensions were growing within the group due to the low productivity of the period, as member Agnetha Faltskog commented; "I can tell from the look in Björn's eyes when he gets home how the day's work has been. Many times the boys have been working for ten hours without coming up with one single note". Andersson talked to a reporter at the time saying; "The prospects are not good. It’s worse than ever...We have no idea when we’ll be finished". It became obvious that the album wouldn't be completed by the end of the year and the deadline was extended into 1979. In late 1978, further indication of internal struggles became widely known when it was announced that married couple Ulvaeus and Faltskog were to divorce. Rather than spelling the end for the group however, this freed up a lot of the tensions between the two and in late 1978, work suddenly took off apace for the album.

In October, two tracks were completed: "Angeleyes" and "If It Wasn't for the Nights". Although seen as an archetype ABBA track, the former of these was deemed dated by Andersson, labelling it "back to the sixties". The second track however featured an all-out contemporary vibe, being quite disco-orientated and considered the strongest song that had been recorded for the album. It was intended to be not only the next single but also the song that ABBA would perform at the Music for UNICEF Concert in January 1979. This plan was changed however when an even-better song came along in December. With the original title of  "In the Arms of Rosalita", "Chiquitita" was the song the band performed. Although rather more schlager in style, Andersson considered it the best of their new songs, despite the feeling that it was very out of style with the rest of the acts performing that night. "It was pretty strange, but we felt it was the best song we had and that's why we chose it, however wrong it may have been", he said. In early 1979, "Chiquitita" became one of ABBA's biggest hits around the world, reaching No. 1 in many countries, although just being clipped by Blondie's "Heart of Glass" in the UK at No. 2.

At the end of January, Andersson and Ulvaeus left Sweden and rented an apartment in the Bahamas where they felt they could get some inspiration by listening to American music and experiencing a whole different vibe to the rather conservative Stockholm. Two songs emerged from this time; "Voulez-Vous" and "Kisses of Fire". Excited by the former, they went to Criteria Studios in Miami to record the backing track with the disco band Foxy — the only time they recorded a song outside Sweden. Upon returning to Sweden to finish the songs, another track, "Does Your Mother Know", was recorded - a song that was to be the next single, and also the only mainstream release to feature Ulvaeus on lead vocals. The single would not become as big a hit worldwide as "Chiquitita", but was the most successful release from the album in the US.

By the end of March, the final two tracks were finished; "As Good as New" and "I Have a Dream" (the latter featuring a local children's choir from the International School of Stockholm).

Release
At the end of April the album, titled Voulez-Vous, was finally ready for release and to emphasize the shift towards a disco sound, the album cover shot was taken at Alexandra's night club in Stockholm. The album was released on 23 April 1979, and in the following months of its launch, ABBA released a number of other singles from it. The title track was released as a double A-side with "Angeleyes", while "I Have a Dream" was belatedly released in December 1979 following their recent world tour. A track recorded in August 1979 (four months after the release of the album), "Gimme! Gimme! Gimme! (A Man After Midnight)", was released as a single in October and was later included as a bonus track on CD versions of Voulez-Vous.

Reception

Critical

The album received favorable reviews from music critics. Bruce Eder from the AllMusic website gave the album three and a half stars out of five and noted that "about half of Voulez-Vous shows the heavy influence of the Bee Gees from their megahit disco era" but that it also "had a pair of soft, lyrical Europop-style ballads" which according to him sounds like "popular folk music during the mid-to-late '60s". Sean Egan from BBC gave the album a favorable review in which he wrote that the album "was an effort that saw Agnetha, Benny, Björn and Anni-Frid put their dancing shoes on to join in with the dominant disco craze" and also that the album ballads "are able to provide a pocket of air on a disco floor that would otherwise get sweaty and stultifying".

Commercial
Voulez-Vous topped the charts all over Europe (including the UK, where it entered the charts at No. 1 and remained there for a month), and was a Top 10 success in countries including Canada, New Zealand and Australia. In the US, Voulez-Vous became ABBA's third album to reach the top 20 (peaking at No. 19).

Track listing

Notes:
 mislabelled as "If It Wasn't for the Night" on 2001 reissue.
 mislabelled as 4:12.

Personnel
Agnetha Fältskog – vocals
Anni-Frid Lyngstad – vocals
Björn Ulvaeus – banjo, guitar, vocals
Benny Andersson – synthesizer, keyboards, vocals

Additional musicians

Rolf Alex – drums
Ola Brunkert – drums
Lars Carlsson – horn
Anders Eljas – horn
Joe Galdo – drums 
Malando Gassama – percussion
Rutger Gunnarsson – bass
Paul Harris – piano
Janne Kling – wind
Nils Landgren – trombone
Ish Ledesma – guitar 
Roger Palm – drums
Halldor Palsson – tenor saxophone
Arnold Paseiro – bass 
Jan Risberg – oboe
Janne Schaffer – guitar, sitar
Johan Stengård – tenor saxophone
Åke Sundqvist – percussion
George Terry – guitar 
Mike Watson – bass
Lasse Wellander – guitar
Kajtek Wojciechowski – tenor saxophone
Gunnar Mickols – violin
Anders Dahl – violin

Production
Benny Andersson; Björn Ulvaeus – producers
Michael B. Tretow – engineer
Benny Andersson, Björn Ulvaeus, Anders Eljas, Rutger Gunnarsson – arrangers
Rune Söderqvist – design
Ola Lager – photography
Jon Astley, Tim Young, Michael B. Tretow – remastering for the 1997 remasters
Jon Astley, Michael B. Tretow – remastering for the 2001 remasters
Henrik Jonsson – remastering for The Complete Studio Recordings box set

Charts

Weekly charts

Year-end charts

Decade-end charts

Certifications and sales

See also
List of number-one albums in Norway
List of number-one singles and albums in Sweden
List of UK Albums Chart number ones of the 1970s

References

External links
Abba4therecord.com – webpage showing Voulez-Vous releases worldwide

1979 albums
ABBA albums
Polar Music albums
Albums recorded at Polar Studios
Albums produced by Björn Ulvaeus
Albums produced by Benny Andersson
Atlantic Records albums
Epic Records albums